The Stad Ship Tunnel is a planned canal and tunnel to bypass the Stad peninsula in Stad Municipality in Vestland county, Norway. The peninsula is one of the most exposed areas on the coast, without any outlying islands to protect it from the weather. The section has traditionally been one of the most dangerous along the coast of Norway. When built it will be the first full-size ship tunnel in the world.

Location

The surrounding waters, known as the Stadhavet Sea, is the most windswept part of the nation's coastline and is stormy around 100 days of the year, leading to ships often waiting days to pass through. Currents, created by the area marking the meeting point of the North Sea and the Norwegian Sea further complicate navigation: Since World War Two ended, 33 deaths have occurred in maritime accidents within the Stadhavet Sea. The official Visit Norway website has claimed Vikings would drag their boats over the peninsula to avoid crossing the dangerous patch of sea.

Planning

The latter would have allowed the boats to be raised onto wagons and to be hauled across, and would cost only half as much.

In 2011, a report by Det Norske Veritas and the Institute for Research in Economics and Business Administration for the Norwegian Coastal Administration concluded that a tunnel would not be economical. It looked at two sizes, small and large, which would cost  respectively. A similar report from 2007 concluded that the tunnel would be economical. The Coastal Administration stated that the differences were because of new and better data.

In 2013, the tunnel was included for the first time in the National Transport Plan.  was set aside for it in the budget.

The other option is a slightly longer tunnel from the Skårbø farm to the Fløde farm through the central part of the peninsula. The second option has been selected for construction.

Knut Samset, a project management professor with at the Norwegian University of Science and Technology, criticised the decision to go ahead, claiming modern vessels could navigate the seas safely and that "cost-benefit analysis is negative".

Construction
Terje Andreassen, temporary project manager, states that construction is expected to start in 2023 with an estimated completion in 2025 or 2026.

Owing to the thick gneiss requiring tunnelled through, a "drill and blast" process is proposed by Andreassen, with materials delivered by sea owing to inadequacy of local roads, and a rock wall or possibly cofferdams being used to keep the tunnel free of water during construction. Approximately three million cubic metres of rock require removal. The tunnel's entrances have been designed by Norwegian firm Snøhetta with rock walls left rough to blend into its surrounding landscape. Snøhetta's designs include walkways and the construction of a new road bridge to enhance views of ships passing in and out of the tunnel. 

Negotiations for requisite purchases of land and identification of a principal contractor began in April 2021. Several Norwegian and international companies are reviewing information on the project.

References

Canal tunnels
Proposed tunnels in Norway
Stad, Norway
Norwegian Coastal Administration